Sabrina Windmüller (born 13 October 1987) is a female Swiss former ski jumper.

Career 
She is the first winner in history of Ladies' World Cup ski jumping. She took 1st place in World Cup on 7 January 2012 in Hinterzarten on the normal hill.

World Cup

Standings

Wins

External links

1987 births
Living people
Swiss female ski jumpers
People from Walenstadt
Sportspeople from the canton of St. Gallen